Erick Stalin Morillo Calderón (born 19 February 2000) is a Peruvian footballer who plays as a right-back for César Vallejo.

Career

Club career
Morillo is a product of César Vallejo and got his official and professional debut for the club on 3 June 2018 against Juan Aurich in the Peruvian Segunda División. He made a total of two appearances for César Vallejo in the 2018 season, helping the team with promotion to the Peruvian Primera División.

In the 2019 season, Morillo only made one league appearance. In the 2020 season, he got his breakthrough and became a regular starter for the team, making 25 league appearances throughout the season.

References

External links
 

Living people
2000 births
Association football defenders
Peruvian footballers
Peruvian Primera División players
Club Deportivo Universidad César Vallejo footballers